P.S. Senior Secondary School is situated in the Mylapore area of Chennai, India. Most students graduating enter higher education institutions especially engineering institutions like NIT Tiruchi and Anna University. It is rated among the top five schools in Chennai city.

Notable staff 
Dr. Revathy Parameswaran (Principal), head of math department. Distinguished Fulbright award. Published articles in international journals in mathematics education. Conducts workshops for Teachers in technology in math education.
Mr. R. Sivakumar (Senior Vice Principal) head of Physics department.
Mrs. N.Padmasri Nirmalkumar (Vice Principal) HOD of Commerce and second experienced teacher of the school.
Dr. S. Venkatraman is an art master who is also a Pearson awardee as well as National Awardee. His work is related to art in Indian architecture.
Mr. P. Gurumoorthy, a physics teacher.
Mrs. Radha . S, HOD of Computer Science Department
Mr. N. Sathyaprakash, M.A, (Sanskrit) HOD – Sanskrit

History
The school was founded by Mr. Pennathur Subramania Iyer. The emphasis of the Tamil Nadu state Government on Tamil being used as the medium of instruction was causing a fall in Tamil Nadu's share of employment in all-India and central services and in the national science and technology establishments.  In 1973 P.S. Charities promoted the establishment of English medium schools. The P.S. Educational Society started, on 9 June 1976, P.S. Senior Secondary School, starting with standards I-VII from 1976.

P.S.Senior Secondary School (affiliated with the CBSE), was started to help the public and very importantly, the employees of the central government and in the matter of the educational affairs of their children. The school is located in a spacious campus with well-equipped science laboratories and libraries. The school has a playground which spans over 10,000 square metres and a lot of importance is given to sports. The school also houses an art center, which focuses on identifying and nurturing talent.

This decision was passed in the court case at the Madras High Court, labelled Dr. S. Anandalakshmy versus Government of India CBSE.

Current principal
Mrs. Revathy Parameswaran has a doctorate in mathematics education from Chennai Mathematical Institute.  She has 28 years of teaching experience.  She is a Distinguished Fulbright awardee. She has published several papers in international journals. Conducts workshop for teachers in technology in mathematics education.

Current vice principals
Mr. R. Sivakumar(Senior), Mrs. N.Padmasri Nirmalkumar

Facilities
 Art Centre
Hall for yoga/dance classes
Halls for conducting dance, music (vocal and instrumental), drawing and craft classes
 Hall for English Language Activity Centre for Classes I to VIII.
 Five Audio Visual rooms to enable computer-aided teaching
 Math Lab for classes I – X
 Computer Labs
UPS supported Computer Lab with 65 computers and 2 servers for classes IX–XII.
Junior Computer lab with 25 computers supported by five host computers for classes I–VIII
 Sekhar Hall is an air-conditioned lecture hall with a seating capacity of 150, where lectures, workshops and in-service programmes are conducted.
 Auditorium (with fully equipped audio system) with a seating capacity of 400.
 KG activity room
 Examination hall to accommodate 150 students
 Science labs (secondary and senior secondary) for physics, chemistry and biology with a capacity to accommodate 40 students at a time.
 Junior science lab for the middle school segment
 Environmental science lab for primary students
 Libraries
 New Smart Boards in classrooms to increase the options for teaching
 Cameras in classrooms and corridors for increased security
Main computerised library with a stock of 10,000 books
 Junior Library with 5000 Books
 A new e-library is introduced with about 20 computers.
 Addon library (computerised) with a circulating inventory of 1500 latest books, which is replenished at the rate of 100 fresh titles every month
 K.G Library with a stock of 1000 books
 Teacher resource centre houses Internet-enabled computers with broadband connection.
 For classes I–XII, an interactive material called Extramarks has been added. It is an e-learning material and is introduced for better interaction as a smart board in every class.

Correspondents
 P.C. Sekhar – Founder correspondent (1976–1994)
 A.R. Jagannathan - Honorary secretary and correspondent (1994–2005)
 A.N. Radhakrishnan - Honorary secretary and correspondent (2005–2017)
 R. Sivakumar - 2017-18
 K.V.S Gopalakrishnan - 2019–2021
 Pennathur Subramaniam Prabhakar - 2021 to present

Principals
 Thangam – first principal (1976–1978)
 Alamelu Ganapathi – principal - 1978–1999
 Vijayalakshmi Srivatsan – principal - 1999–2007
 Lakshmi Srinivasan – principal - 2007–2018
 Revathy Parameswaran - principal - 2018–current

Description
The school is situated on a  campus with a playground as its center, divided into four blocks:

 Administration: consists of the principal's office, the computer science laboratory, the electrical gadgets lab, the seminar and examination halls, the audio visual room and the mathematics laboratory.
 Science: houses the classrooms for middle and senior school students, the Science and Typewriting labs and the library.
 Yoga: extracurricular activities such as music and dance and indoor sports.
 Primary, Middle, Secondary and Senior Secondary blocks are there with its separate staff rooms.

There is a kindergarten block with a small playground.

The main school playground has a badminton court, three volleyball-cum-throwball courts, a basketball court, a football court, and two cricket nets.

Olympiads and competitive examinations
Wins at the International and National Olympiads from 1995 to 2010:
Mathematics Olympiad
1995–1996, Silver Medal (Toronto, Canada)
1999–2000, Silver Medal (Bucharest, Romania)

Biology Olympiad
1999–2000 Silver Medal (Antalya, Turkey)
2001–2002 Bronze Medal (Jurmala, Latvia)
2002–2003 Bronze Medal (Minsk, Belarus)
2004–2005 Gold Medal (Beijing, China)
2007–2008 Silver Medal (Mumbai, India)

Chemistry Olympiad
2001–2002 Bronze Medal (Groningen, Netherlands)
2002–2003 Gold Medal (Athens, Greece)
2002–2003 Silver Medal (Athens, Greece)
2005 Silver Medal (Taipei, Taiwan)
2004 Gold Medal - National Level Olympiad
2004 Gold Medal - National Level Olympiad
2009 Top 10 Medal at National Level Olympiad

International Olympiad for Informatics
2006 Bronze Medal (Merida, Mexico)
2009 Silver Medal (Bulgaria)

Sports achievements
 CBSE Under 19 National Girls Football Championship 2013-2014 - Bronze Medal
 Commonwealth Chess Championship (2008) Boys Under-14 – Gold Medal
 World Youth Chess Championship 2009
 Table Tennis State Champion in Junior Girls Category
 Women State Ranking No. 2
 TNCA U16 boys cricket tournament Winners
CBSE Under 19 National Girls Football Championship- Winner

The school has two of its students who have qualified for the finals of the World Scholars Cup to be held at Yale University USA.
The school has four of its students in the under-16 boys cricket team.

Cultural Achievements
PS Senior is one of the top schools in Chennai in culturals.
 PS has secured first place in 6 of 8 cultural fests it participated in the year 2017–present.
 PS Senior also hosts a cultural fest named Scintilation.

Notable alumni
 S. Sowmya
 Haricharan
 Savitha Sastry
 AK Srikanth
 Aditi Balan
Samanth Subramanian
Ramanan Laxminarayanan

References

External links
 Official school website

Primary schools in Tamil Nadu
High schools and secondary schools in Chennai
Educational institutions established in 1976
1976 establishments in Tamil Nadu